Edin Škorić (born 1 December 1975) is a former Serbian volleyball player. As a member of FR Yugoslavia national team, he won gold medal at the 2001 European Championship in Ostrava. He lived in Bihać only 2 years and in Zagreb, Croatia 14 years, before he came in Belgrade, Serbia where he lives now.

References
 CEV profile
 greekvolley.com

1975 births
People from Bihać
Living people
Sportspeople from Belgrade
Serbian men's volleyball players
Yugoslav men's volleyball players
Serbian expatriate sportspeople in Greece
Serbian expatriate sportspeople in Italy
Serbian expatriate sportspeople in France
Serbian expatriate sportspeople in Iran
Serbian expatriate sportspeople in Austria
Serbian expatriate sportspeople in Cyprus
Serbian expatriate sportspeople in Romania
Serbs of Bosnia and Herzegovina